Starotimkino (İśke Timkä) is a rural locality (a village) and the administrative centre of Bogdanovsky Selsoviet, Baltachevsky District, Bashkortostan, Russia. The population was 505 as of 2010. There are 12 streets.

Geography 
Starotimkino is located 23 km southeast of Starobaltachevo (the district's administrative centre) by road. Bogdanovo is the nearest rural locality.

References 

Rural localities in Baltachevsky District